Tímea Babos and Andrea Hlaváčková defeated Kiki Bertens and Johanna Larsson in the final, 4–6, 6–4, [10–5] to win the doubles tennis title at the 2017 WTA Finals.

Ekaterina Makarova and Elena Vesnina were the defending champions, but were defeated in the semifinals by Bertens and Larsson.

Seeds

  Chan Yung-jan /  Martina Hingis (semifinals)
  Ekaterina Makarova /  Elena Vesnina (semifinals)
  Tímea Babos /  Andrea Hlaváčková (champions)
  Ashleigh Barty /  Casey Dellacqua (quarterfinals)
  Gabriela Dabrowski /  Xu Yifan (quarterfinals)
  Anna-Lena Grönefeld /  Květa Peschke (quarterfinals)
  Andreja Klepač /  María José Martínez Sánchez (quarterfinals)
  Kiki Bertens / Johanna Larsson (Runner-ups)

Draw

Draw

References
 Main Draw

2017 Doubles
Finals